The Corporation is a 2012 Argentine drama film directed by Fabián Forte.

Cast 
 Osmar Núñez as Felipe Mentor
 Mariana Anghileri as Luz
 Juan Palomino as Robledo
 Sergio Boris as Juan Carlos
 Federico Luppi as Dalmaso
 Carlos Echevarría as Driznik

References

External links 

2012 drama films
2012 films
Argentine drama films
2010s Argentine films